Rony Brauman (born June 19, 1950, in Jerusalem) is a French physician specializing in tropical diseases. 

He was one of the early members of Médecins sans frontières (Doctors without Borders), and was its president from 1982 to 1994. As president, Brauman oversaw the financial and operational expansion of the movement, including the establishment of new operational centers and chapters around the world. He was a professor at the Institut d'études politiques de Paris (Sciences po) from 1994 to 1997 and is now scientific advisor in the school of international affairs of Sciences po. 

With Israeli director Eyal Sivan, his cousin, he co-directed a documentary (1999) on the trial of Adolf Eichmann (1961) based on Hannah Arendt's 1963 book Eichmann in Jerusalem.

Brauman is also Director of the Humanitarian and Conflict Response Institute (HCRI) at the University of Manchester.

References

External links 
 

1950 births
Living people
French tropical physicians
French humanitarians
20th-century French Jews
Physicians from Jerusalem
20th-century French physicians
21st-century French physicians